A pulverized coal-fired boiler is an industrial or utility boiler that generates thermal energy by burning pulverized coal (also known as powdered coal or coal dust since it is as fine as face powder in cosmetic makeup) that is blown into the firebox. 

The basic idea of a firing system using pulverised fuel is to use the whole volume of the furnace for the combustion of solid fuels. Coal is ground to the size of a fine grain, mixed with air and burned in the flue gas flow. Biomass and other materials can also be added to the mixture. Coal contains mineral matter which is converted to ash during combustion. The ash is removed as bottom ash and fly ash. The bottom ash is removed at the furnace bottom.

This type of boiler dominates coal-fired power stations, providing steam to drive large turbines.

History
Prior to the developments leading to the use of pulverized coal, most boilers utilized grate firing where the fuel was mechanically distributed onto a moving grate at the bottom of the firebox in a partially crushed gravel-like form. Air for combustion was blown upward through the grate carrying the lighter ash and smaller particles of unburned coal up with it, some of which would adhere to the sides of the firebox. In 1918, The Milwaukee Electric Railway and Light Company, later Wisconsin Electric, conducted tests in the use of pulverized coal at its Oneida Street power plant. Those experiments helped Fred L. Dornbrook to develop methods of controlling the pulverized coal's tarry ash residues with boiler feed water tube jackets that served to reduce the surface temperature of the firebox walls and allowed the ash deposits be easily removed. That plant became the first central power station in the United States to use pulverized fuel. 

The Oneida Street power plant near Milwaukee's City Hall was decommissioned and renovated in 1987. It is now the site of the Milwaukee Repertory Theatre.

How it works

The concept of burning coal that has been pulverized into a fine powder stems from the belief that if the coal is made fine enough, it will burn almost as easily and efficiently as a gas. The feeding rate of the pulverized coal is controlled by computers, and is varied according to the boiler demand and the amount of air available for drying and transporting fuel. Pieces of coal are crushed between balls or cylindrical rollers that move between two tracks or "races." As the coal gets crushed by the rolling action, the hot air dries it and blows out the usable fine coal powder to be used as fuel. The powdered coal from the pulverizer is directly blown to a burner in the boiler. The burner mixes the powdered coal in the air suspension with additional pre-heated combustion air and forces it out of a nozzle similar in action to fuel being atomized by a fuel injector in an internal combustion engine. Under operating conditions, there is enough heat in the combustion zone to ignite all the incoming fuel.

Ash removal
There are two methods of ash removal at furnace bottom:
Dry bottom boiler
Wet bottom boiler, also called Slag tap

The fly ash is carried away with the flue gas and is separated from it into various hoppers along its path, and finally in an ESP or a bag filter.

Current technologies
Pulverized coal power plants are divided into three categories: subcritical pulverized coal (SubCPC) plants, supercritical pulverized coal (SCPC) plants, and ultra-supercritical pulverized coal (USCPC) plants.  The primary difference between the three types of pulverized coal boilers are the operating temperatures and pressures. Subcritical plants operate below the critical point of water (647.096 K and 22.064 MPa). Supercritical and ultra-supercritical plants operate above the critical point. As pressures and temperatures increase, so does the operating efficiency. Subcritical plants operate at about 37% efficiency, supercritical plants at about 40%, and ultra-supercritical plants in the 42-45% range. 

There are many type of pulverized coal, having different calorific values (CV), such as Indonesian coal or steel grade coal (Indian coal),

Steam locomotives
Pulverized coal firing has been used, to a limited extent, in steam locomotives.  For example, see Prussian G 12.

Merchant ships
In 1929, the United States Shipping Board evaluated a pulverized coal-boiler on the steamship Mercer, a 9,500 ton merchant ship. According to its report, the boiler heated with pulverized coal on the Mercer ran at 95% of the efficiency of its best oil-fuelled journey. Firing pulverized coal was also cheaper to operate and install than ship boilers using oil as fuel. First steps towards using Diesel engines as means of propulsion (on smaller ships) were also undertaken by the end of the 1920s ― see Dieselisation.

See also
Coal-water slurry fuel
Fluidized bed combustion
Pulverizer

References

External links
 Article on pulverized coal power at the World Resources Institute
 University of Stuttgart: Cyclone Furnace
 Chinese Coal Imports
 Outdoor Wood Boilers

Power station technology
Boilers
Coal technology
Energy conversion